Colonial architecture is an hybrid architectural style that arose as colonists combined architectural styles from their country of origin with design characteristics of the invaded country. Colonists frequently built houses and buildings in a style that was familiar to them but with local characteristics more suited to their new climate. 

In recent years, people in the interior design community are beginning to acknowledge the baggage the term might have - and to explore how the style may be appreciated whilst also acknowledging the harm and trauma of the Colonial era.

Below are links to specific articles about colonial architecture, specifically the modern colonies:

Spanish colonial architecture

Spanish Colonial architecture is still found in the former colonies of the Spanish Empire in the Americas and in the Philippines. In Mexico, it is found in the Historic center of Mexico City, Puebla, Zacatecas, Querétaro, Guanajuato, and Morelia. Antigua Guatemala in Guatemala is also known for its well-preserved Spanish colonial style architecture. Other cities known for Spanish colonial heritage are Ciudad Colonial of Santo Domingo, the ports of Cartagena, Colombia, and Old San Juan in Puerto Rico.

North America

Viceroyalty of New Spain

New Spanish Baroque

Spanish Colonial Revival architecture

Caribbean
Spanish West Indies 

South America
Viceroyalty of Peru, Viceroyalty of New Granada, and Viceroyalty of the Río de la Plata

Asia
Spanish East Indies

Earthquake Baroque
Bahay na Bato

Portuguese colonial architecture

Portuguese colonial architecture is most visible in Brazil, Madeira, North Africa and Sub-Saharan Africa, Macau, the Malaysian city of Malacca, city of Goa in India, and Moluccas and Java in Indonesia.

Asia

Sino-Portuguese architecture
 
South America

British colonial architecture

British colonial architecture are most visible in North America, the British West Indies, South Asia, Australia, New Zealand and South Africa.

North America
American colonial architecture
Federal Architecture
First Period 
Colonial Georgian architecture
British colonial architecture in Canada
South Asia
British colonial architecture in India
British colonial architecture in Pakistan
Colonial architecture in Sri Lanka
Australia
Colonial architecture of Australia 
Federation architecture
Far East
British colonial architecture in Hong Kong
British colonial architecture in Singapore

French colonial architecture

French colonial architecture is most visible in North America and Indochina.  
Indochina
North America
French colonial architecture in North America
South Asia
French colonial architecture in India

Dutch colonial architecture

Dutch colonial architecture is most visible in Indonesia (especially Java and Sumatra), the United States, South Asia, and South Africa. In Indonesia, formerly Dutch East Indies, colonial architecture was studied academically and had developed into a new tropical architecture form which emphasizes on conforming to the tropical climate of the Indies and not completely imitating the architectural language of the Dutch colonists. 
Indonesia
Dutch colonial architecture of Indonesia
Old Indies Style
Indies Empire style
New Indies Style
North America
Dutch colonial architecture in North America
Dutch Colonial Revival architecture
South Asia
Dutch colonial architecture in India
Colonial architecture in Sri Lanka
South Africa
Cape Dutch architecture

Italian colonial architecture
Italian colonial architecture is visible in Libya which was colonized by Italy after defeating the Ottoman Army in 1912 during the Italo - Turkish War with huge colonial architecture in the Capital Tripoli and in other major cities like Benghazi and Misrata.

Eritrea an Italian colony from 1890 to 1941 when the British occupied it during world war 2 with prominent colonial architecture spanning from styles like Art Deco to Neoclassical architecture spread out from the capital Asmara to the smaller towns of Karen with Italian colonial architecture even being a huge tourist attraction of the country. 

Somalia was an Italian colony from 1889 to 1941 and again from 1950 to 1960, like Eritrea Italian colonial architecture was spread out across the country in different architectural styles but with the civil war of 1991 and years of violence after most of the Italian colonial architecture being destroyed or decayed with nowadays only a few buildings existing such as the Vila Somalia where the president resides. 

The Greek islands of the Dodecanese which was won over during the Italo - Turkish war like Libya with the largest city of the island Rhodes being built entirely by the Italian colonists and its main government buildings also being built by the Italian colonists.

See also
 Colonial Revival architecture
 American colonial architecture

References

External links
Website on colonial architecture with 29,000 pictures of colonial buildings around the world by Gauvin Alexander Bailey of Queen's University and funded by the Social Sciences and Humanities Research Council of Canada and the National Endowment for the Humanities

 
Architectural styles
Architectural history
History of European colonialism